Crossnore School Historic District is a historic school campus and national historic district located at Crossnore, Avery County, North Carolina. It encompasses four contributing buildings and one contributing structure and are the oldest surviving buildings associated with the school established here in 1913. The buildings were built between 1928 and 1960, and constructed of stone, frame, or log construction, and stand  or 2 stories in height. They are the Daughters of the American Revolution Dormitory / Cooper Building (1933, 1960), E.H. Sloop Chapel (1956), DAR Chapter House (1958-1959), Garrett Memorial Hospital / Edwin Guy Building (1928, 2006-2007), bell tower (1951, 1960), and the separately listed Weaving Room of Crossnore School (1936, 1986).

It was listed on the National Register of Historic Places in 2009.

References

Historic districts on the National Register of Historic Places in North Carolina
School buildings on the National Register of Historic Places in North Carolina
Schools in Avery County, North Carolina
National Register of Historic Places in Avery County, North Carolina